Arturo Andrés Ithurralde (March 6, 1934 – June 3, 2017) was Argentine football referee. He was known for having refereed one match in the 1982 FIFA World Cup in Spain. He also refereed four matches at 1975 and 1983 Copa América.

References

External links 
 
 
 

1934 births
2017 deaths
Argentine people of Basque descent
Argentine football referees
FIFA World Cup referees
1982 FIFA World Cup referees
Copa América referees